Maurice Charles Golden (born 12 January 1980) is a Scottish Conservative politician.  He has been a Member of the Scottish Parliament (MSP) for the North East Scotland region since the May 2021 Scottish Parliament election, after having previously been elected in 2016 for West Scotland. Golden was the Shadow Cabinet Secretary for Economy, Fair Work and Culture until May 2021. Golden was also previously Chief Whip and Business Manager.

Early life and education
Golden attended Gowriehill Primary School, the High School of Dundee and the University of Dundee from 1997 until 2001, and graduated with an MA (Honours) degree in Economics before going on to complete an MPhil in urban and cultural history and an LLM in Environmental Law. In 2010, Golden received qualification from the Chartered Institution of Wastes Management.

Golden has experience in the waste and energy sectors, previously working for Ofgem and Consumer Focus as well as with Local Authorities advising on kerbside collections. He led the Circular Economy Programme for Zero Waste Scotland after 2011.

Political career
Golden has been a member of the Conservative Party since 1998. Golden stood for the Local Authority Elections in Dundee in Sidlaw West in 2002. He worked as a Campaign Manager for Douglas Taylor in the Perth and North Perthshire constituency in 2005. He stood for the Scottish Parliament in 2007 as the Conservative candidate for Central Fife. He was selected as the Conservative Party candidate in the Glenrothes by-election for the Westminster Parliament in 2008, securing third place as Labour retained the seat. Two years later Golden secured second place in Central Ayrshire with 8,934 votes after standing in the 2010 UK General Election. In 2011, Golden stood for election to the Scottish Parliament in the Cunninghame North constituency.

In 2016, Golden stood for the Scottish Parliament as the Conservative candidate for Clydebank and Milngavie where he trebled the vote although came third, then was elected from the West Scotland regional list. Golden was the Chief Whip and Business Manager, and Spokesperson for the Low Carbon Economy in the Parliament.

At the 2021 Scottish Parliament election, he was re-elected to the Scottish Parliament for the North East Scotland region.

Maurice has pushed for a Private members' bill to tackle dog theft. The official consultation is expected to begin in 2022.

Personal life 
In 2016, Golden was made a fellow of the Royal Society for the Encouragement of Arts, Manufactures and Commerce.

References

External links 
 

1980 births
Living people
Alumni of the University of Dundee
Place of birth missing (living people)
Conservative MSPs
Members of the Scottish Parliament 2016–2021
Members of the Scottish Parliament 2021–2026
People educated at the High School of Dundee
Scottish Conservative Party parliamentary candidates